Joseph Momanyi is a Kenyan judoka. He competed in the men's half-lightweight event at the 1992 Summer Olympics.

References

Year of birth missing (living people)
Living people
Kenyan male judoka
Olympic judoka of Kenya
Judoka at the 1992 Summer Olympics
Place of birth missing (living people)